CCGS CG 117 was one of three training vessels of the Canadian Coast Guard and located at the Canadian Coast Guard College in Westmount, Nova Scotia. The ship is based on the 44-foot Motor Lifeboat, a converted self-righting lifeboat and variant of the Waveney class lifeboat. It was sold in 2011.

See also

  – sister boat and retired training vessel for the Canadian Coast Guard

References

External links

CG 117
1975 ships
Ships built in Quebec
Ships of the Canadian Coast Guard